James Parks Morton (January 7, 1930 – January 4, 2020) was an American Episcopal priest and founder of the Interfaith Center of New York.

Cathedral of St. John the Divine 
Morton was dean of the Cathedral of St. John the Divine for 25 years (1972–1996). During his tenure at the cathedral, he started many new projects and initiatives, including the "Green Cathedral Initiative," and inviting artists in residence such as Paul Winter, Philippe Petit & I Giuliari di Piazza.

Projects 
Morton spoke about his personal relationship with the "green movement" in the film The 11th Hour. In 1996, the National Audubon Society awarded him its highest honor, the Audubon Medal.
He is a contributor to Seven Pillars House of Wisdom.

Press 
Morton worked with Imam Feisal Abdul Rauf during the Park51 scandal following September 11, 2001.

References 

1930 births
2020 deaths
American Episcopal priests